Rajapart Rangadurai is a 1973 Indian Tamil-language drama film, directed by P. Madhavan. It stars Sivaji Ganesan and Ushanandini. The film was released on 22 December 1973.

Plot 
Rajapart Rangadurai narrates the life journey of a theatre actor. He is parentless who joins the stage under V.K Ramasamy. He takes care of his brother Baskar and sister Seetha. His brother, however, is not content being poor, fakes being rich and gets married to Vasanthi who is the daughter of an industrialist played by T.K Bhagavathi. Rangadurai's plan of getting his sister married from the dowry he would get for his brother's marriage with Alamel, daughter of industrialist Somasundaram is thrown over the bridge by his brother's action. Rangadurai gets married to Alamel who was secretly in love with him being a fan of his stage performances where he is unparalleled and well respected. 

Cinema enters the society throwing the troupe into abject poverty. Somasundaram's mill workers, who are fans of Rangadurai's work, support his troupe giving him the chance to recoup. With their love, support and help, the troupe comes back to vogue and they become well-off. However, Seetha dies due to ill-treatment at her in-laws while Basker is exposed at his in-laws causing trouble for both. At one stage, Somasundaram and his partner, Mohanraj, refuse to give bonus and the very factory workers who supported him are now in strike. Rangadurai decides to do a free play out of gratitude. With his star-power, Mohanraj is sure that the workers will not relent and decides to assasinate Rangadurai on stage much to disamy of Somasundaram who does not want to see his daughter a window as much as he hates Rangadurai. Does Mohanraj succeed?

Cast 
Sivaji Ganesan as Rangadurai/Rajapart
Ushanandini as Alamel
M. N. Nambiar as Somasundaram
V. K. Ramasamy as Drama Teacher & Drama Group Owner
S. V. Ramadas as Mohanraj
Srikanth as Baskar
Kumari Padmini as Vasanthi
Sasikumar as Ramu
Jaya as Seetha
C. K. Saraswathi as Ramu's mother
T. K. Bhagavathi as Vasanthi's father
V. R. Thilagam as Meenakshi
Suruli Rajan as Konangipatti/Konangi
Manorama as Chinthamani
Senthamarai as Karuppaiya
Poornam Viswanathan as Jilla Collector
Samikannu as Sivakozhunthu
Boopathy Raja as Young Rangadurai
Seethalakshmi as (Tiruppur Kumaran Mother Drama Artist)
Angamuthu as (Drama Group's)
Sedhupathy as Radhakrishnan Pillai
Heran Ramasamy as Aarumugam
Venkadachalam Pillai as Drama Audion's
S. N. Parvathy as Doctor (Seetha Pregnant Delivery)
Sridevi as Valli (Young Chinthamani, Drama Actor)
Radha Ravi as (Baskar Friend, college mate)
Karuppu Subbiah as (Drama Group's)
Loose Mohan as (Drama Group's)
Pattom Sadan as (Drama Group's)
Pakoda Kadhar as Ittuli (Drama Group's)

Production 
In the scenes where Rangadurai speaks Shakespearean English, Ganesan's voice was dubbed by Shakespeare Sundaram.

Soundtrack 
The music was composed by M. S. Viswanathan, while the lyrics were written by Kannadasan.

Re-release 
A digitally restored version was released in mid-2017, and ran for over 100 days theatrically.

References

External links 
 

1970s Tamil-language films
1973 films
Films about actors
Films about theatre
Films scored by M. S. Viswanathan
Indian drama films
Films directed by P. Madhavan
1973 drama films